Jonas Björkman and Patrick Rafter were the defending champions, but lost in the semifinals this year.

Nicklas Kulti and Mikael Tillström won the title, defeating Mahesh Bhupathi and David Prinosil 7–6(7–4), 7–6(7–4) in the final.

Seeds

Draw

Draw

External links
Draw

2000 Gerry Weber Open